Conasprella pomponeti is a species of sea snail, a marine gastropod mollusc in the family Conidae, the cone snails, cone shells or cones.

Description
The size of the shell attains 12 mm.

Distribution
This species occurs in the Atlantic Ocean off Brazil.

References

 Petuch E.J. & Myers R.F. (2014) New species of Conidae and Conilithidae (Gastropoda: Conoidea) from the Bahamas, eastern Caribbean, and Brazil. Xenophora Taxonomy 3: 26–46.
  Puillandre N., Duda T.F., Meyer C., Olivera B.M. & Bouchet P. (2015). One, four or 100 genera? A new classification of the cone snails. Journal of Molluscan Studies. 81: 1-23

External links
 To World Register of Marine Species
 

pomponeti
Gastropods described in 2014